Shin Seong-il (May 8, 1937 – November 4, 2018) was a South Korean actor, film director, producer, and former politician. A legendary actor with 500 films in over 40 years, Shin debuted in director Shin Sang-ok's 1960 film A Romantic Papa and rose to fame through popular youth titles. A star in the 1960s and 1970s, however, his status as one of Korea's top actors extended well into the 1980s.

Biography 

Shin's last film was Door to the Night in 2013.

Filmography

Director

Planner

Producer

Awards 
 1963 1st Blue Dragon Film Awards : Favorite Actor
 1964 2nd Blue Dragon Film Awards : Favorite Actor
 1965 3rd Blue Dragon Film Awards : Favorite Actor
 1966 4th Blue Dragon Film Awards : Favorite Actor
 1968 7th Grand Bell Awards : Best Actor for The Wings of Lee Sang
 1970 6th Baeksang Arts Awards : Favorite Film Actor
 1971 7th Baeksang Arts Awards : Favorite Film Actor
 1972 8th Baeksang Arts Awards : Best New Actor for play Spring, summer, fall, and winter
 1972 8th Baeksang Arts Awards : Favorite Film Actor
 1973 9th Baeksang Arts Awards : Favorite Film Actor
 1974 10th Baeksang Arts Awards : Favorite Film Actor
 1975 11th Baeksang Arts Awards : Favorite Film Actor
 1978 14th Baeksang Arts Awards : Best Film Actor for Winter Woman
 1986 25th Grand Bell Awards : Best Supporting Actor for Moonlight Hunter
 1987 23rd Baeksang Arts Awards : Best Film Actor for Lethe's Love Song
 1989 27th Grand Bell Awards : Best Actor for Korean Connection
 1991 15th Golden Cinematography : Favorite Actor
 2004 41st Grand Bell Awards : Special Achievement Award
 2011 47th Baeksang Arts Awards : Lifetime Achievement Award
 2018 Korea Best Star Awards: Achievement Award

References

External links 
 
 

South Korean male film actors
South Korean politicians
South Korean film producers
South Korean film directors
Konkuk University alumni
People from Daegu
1937 births
2018 deaths
South Korean actor-politicians
Kyeongbuk High School alumni
South Korean Buddhists